Castle Rock Mountain is in the Beartooth Mountains in the U.S. state of Montana. The peak is one of the tallest in the Beartooth Mountains, the tenth-tallest in Montana and is in the Absaroka-Beartooth Wilderness, on the border of Custer and Gallatin national forests. Castle Rock Mountain is flanked by the Sundance Glacier to the north and the Castle Rock Glacier to the south.

References

Castle Rock Mountain
Beartooth Mountains
Mountains of Carbon County, Montana